Henri Cazelles (born on 8 June 1912 and died on 10 January 2009 in Paris) was a French exegete, priest of Saint-Sulpice, doctor of theology, licentiate in Sacred Scripture, doctor of law, graduate of the École libre des sciences politiques, doctor honoris causa of the University of Bonn, member of the Egyptian Society, former secretary of the Pontifical Biblical Commission, former director of studies at the EPHE, associate member of the Royal Academy of Belgium, EBU Theology and Religious Sciences.

He is famous for having edited the Supplément au Dictionnaire de la Bible.

Education 
Cazelles become in Doctor with the thesis entitled  	Église et état en Allemagne de Weimar aux premières années du IIIe reich (1936) at the University of Paris.

Award 
Doctor honoris causa at the University of Bonn

Bibliography

Books 

translated into Italian:

References 

1912 births
2009 deaths
French biblical scholars
Sulpicians